Trentham Academy (formerly Trentham High School) is a coeducational secondary school located in the village of Trentham in Stoke-on-Trent, Staffordshire, England.

History
On 3 July 2015, Trentham High made national coverage on ITV's This Morning, about the school's new policy on that school skirts would be banned for females, and only trousers are to be worn.

Subjects
The school offers a range of subjects. Most are compulsory in years 7 and 8 and become optional in years 9, 10 and 11, when students will sit exams.

Subjects include:
Science (physics, chemistry, biology and sex education)
Mathematics
Statistics
English literature
English language
Resistant materials
Religious education
Physical education
Performing arts
Modern foreign languages (French, German and Spanish)
History
Health and social care
Geography
Design and technology
Drama
Dance
Creative performance
Computing/ICT
Business studies (enterprise)
Catering
Art
Media studies
Photography

House system
Trentham Academy operates a house system involving all years. On admission to the school, each student is assigned to one of the three houses:
Pioneer (Red)
Voyager (Green)
Apollo (Yellow)

Within these houses, the students have morning form sessions together consisting of students from years 7 to 9.

House competitions include:
Football
Basketball
Netball
Sports day
Talent shows (a variety of singing, dancing, comics, etc.)
Point collecting (for excellence in subjects and attendance)

Each house is led by an achievement manager, who is in charge of organising all house activities. They are assisted by two house captains, selected from the year 11 students. The house captains are responsible for organising and preparing the teams for the competitions and often officiate at the events themselves.  All students and staff are members of a house. Students at Trentham Academy are all placed into house tutor groups.  A student in year 7 will therefore be placed in a tutor group composed of fellow year 7 students and a number of year 8 and 9 students forming a vertical tutor group.  This enables older students to support and ‘buddy’ year 7 students in all aspects of school life.

Feeder schools
 Ash Green Primary School
 Priory Church Academy

Leavers destinations
Trentham does have a sixth form but most students progress their studies onto local sixth forms and college. The main destinations include: City of Stoke-on-Trent Sixth Form College, Newcastle-under-Lyme College sixth form and local grammar school St Josephs Sixth Form.

On average students leave with 14 GCSEs.

References

Secondary schools in Stoke-on-Trent
Academies in Stoke-on-Trent